Marlon Ricardo Harrison (born 19 September 1998) is a Liberian professional footballer who plays as a midfielder for Liberian First Division club LISCR FC and the Liberia national team.

Controversy 
In April 2020, Harrison and six of his Liberia under-20s teammates appeared for a Liberia Football Association (LFA) disciplinary hearing. The players had violated the national team's code of conduct and camping regulations during the 2019 WAFU U-20 Tournament in Guinea. Harrison had allegedly insulted the technical staff for substituting him during the match against Mali on 30 November 2019, in the presence of the head of delegation Charles Massaley.

In December 2021, Harrison was handed a three-month suspension without salary by his club LISCR FC due to a violation of the club's code of conduct. After spending one month on the sidelines, he was forgiven and returned to training.

Honors 
LISCR FC

 Liberian FA Cup: 2019

References 

1998 births
Living people
Liberian footballers
People from Montserrado County
Association football midfielders

Keitrace FC players
LISCR FC players
Liberian First Division players
Liberia international footballers